The Delaware District is a neighborhood in Buffalo, New York.

Geography 
The Delaware District neighborhood is in the west central part of Buffalo. The neighborhood is located along Delaware Avenue (NY 384).  The neighborhood is bordered on the south by Allentown.  The northern boundary of the neighborhood abuts Forest Lawn Cemetery and Delaware Park.  Its eastern boundary is Main Street (NY 5).  To the west is Delaware Avenue and the Elmwood Village.

Historic sites
It includes the individual entries on the Buffalo places listed on the National Register of Historic Places: 
 Garret Club
 Hellenic Orthodox Church of the Annunciation
 James and Fanny How House
 Edgar W. Howell House
 Edwin M. and Emily S. Johnston House
 Col. William Kelly House
 Parke Apartments
 Theodore Roosevelt Inaugural National Historic Site
 Saturn Club.

Also located in the neighborhood are Twentieth Century Club and the Women & Children's Hospital of Buffalo.  Much of the central section of the neighborhood is within the Delaware Avenue Historic District.

See also
Neighborhoods of Buffalo, New York

External links

References 

Neighborhoods in Buffalo, New York
University at Buffalo